Jim Dawson (born September 10, 1944) is an American author and self-proclaimed "fartologist", who has specialized in pop culture of early rock and roll and the history of flatulence, having written three books on the latter subject.

Biography
Jim Dawson is a Hollywood-based writer who has specialized in American pop culture (especially early rock 'n' roll) and the history of flatulence (three books so far, including his 1999 top-seller, Who Cut the Cheese? A Cultural History of the Fart). Mojo magazine called his What Was the First Rock 'n' Roll Record (1992), co-written with Steve Propes, "one of the most impressive musical reads of the year"; it remains a valuable source for music critics and rock historians, and an updated second edition is currently available on Kindle. Dawson has also written a series of articles on early rhythm and blues and rock 'n' roll pioneers for the Los Angeles Times, including a front-page story in the Calendar entertainment section on the forgotten tragic figure Ritchie Valens. The piece led directly to Rhino Records reissuing Valens' entire catalog (with Dawson's liner notes) and eventually to the 1987 biopic La Bamba, which used some of Dawson's research. Since 1983 Dawson has also written liner notes for roughly 150 albums and CDs, including Rhino's prestigious "Central Avenue Sounds" box set celebrating the history of jazz and early R&B in Los Angeles.  He's currently working on a novel about a 1920 coal mine war in his native West Virginia.

Books
1999 'Who Cut the Cheese? A Cultural History of the Fart' (Ten Speed Press) 
2006 'Blame It on the Dog: A Modern History of the Fart' (Ten Speed Press) 
2010 'Did Somebody Step on a Duck? A Natural History of the Fart' (Ten Speed Press/Random House) 
1992 'What Was the First Rock 'n' Roll Record?' (with Steve Propes; introductions by Dave Marsh and Billy Vera), (Faber and Faber) 
1995 'The Twist: The Story of the Song and Dance That Changed the World' (Faber and Faber) 
1994 'Nervous Man Nervous: Big Jay McNeely and the Rise of the Honking Tenor Sax' (Big Nickel Publ.) 
1996 'Memories of Buddy Holly' (Big Nickel Publ.) 
2003 '45 RPM: The History, Heroes & Villains of a Pop Music Revolution'(Backbeat Books/Hal Leonard) 
2005 'Rock Around the Clock: The Record That Started the Rock Revolution'(Backbeat Books/Hal Leonard) 
2008 'Los Angeles's Angels Flight' (Arcadia Publishing) 
2009 'The Compleat Motherfucker: A History of the Mother of All Dirty Words' (Feral House) 
2012 'Los Angeles's Bunker Hill: Pulp Fiction's Mean Streets and Film Noir's Ground Zero' (History Books)

References

External links
 Random House
 Jim Dawson

Living people
1944 births
American non-fiction writers
People from Parkersburg, West Virginia